Corozal is a town and municipality in the Sucre Department, northern Colombia.

Notable people
José Serpa (born 1979) professional cyclist

References
 Gobernacion de Sucre - Corozal
 Corozal official website

Sucre